Spirit Trap is a 2005 British thriller horror film directed by Marcus Randall and starring Billie Piper. While the story is set in London, the film was shot in Bucharest, Romania.

Premise
When five unsuspecting students move into a dilapidated mansion, a mysterious spirit clock, long since disused, is set into motion. As the walls of reality slowly fall away, and dark secrets are revealed, the group are thrown headlong into a downward spiral of paranoia, murderous intent and supernatural horror.

External links

References 

2005 films
British horror films
Films set in London
2005 horror films
British haunted house films
Films shot in Romania
2005 directorial debut films
2000s English-language films
2000s British films